Fred 'Fritz' Heifner (23 August 1909 – 27 January 1996) was an Australian rules footballer who played in the VFL between 1929 and 1935 for the Richmond Football Club.

References

Hogan P: The Tigers Of Old, Richmond FC, Melbourne 1996

Richmond Football Club players
Richmond Football Club Premiership players
Australian rules footballers from Victoria (Australia)
1909 births
1996 deaths
One-time VFL/AFL Premiership players